Dipsas tenuissima, Taylor's snail-eater, is a non-venomous snake found in Panama and Costa Rica.

References

Dipsas
Snakes of North America
Reptiles of Panama
Reptiles of Costa Rica
Reptiles described in 1954
Taxa named by Edward Harrison Taylor